Esteban Comilang is a Filipino Canadian actor from Toronto, Ontario. He is most noted for his performance as Reynaldo in the 2021 film Islands, for which he received a Canadian Screen Award nomination for Best Supporting Actor at the 10th Canadian Screen Awards in 2022.

References

External links

21st-century Canadian male actors
Canadian male film actors
Canadian male actors of Filipino descent

Male actors from Toronto

Filipino emigrants to Canada
Living people

Year of birth missing (living people)